Joseph Pace (born 18 November 1959) is an Italian painter and sculptor.

Early life and education 
Joseph Pace was born in Morbegno (Lombardy) and raised in Congo-Kinshasa (Africa). Grandson of Camillo Pace, he was introduced to the visual arts by his uncle Antonio Cardile. He also has followed legal, literary, social and psychoanalytical studies at the University of Paris La Sorbonne, at the Sapienza University of Rome and at the Roma Tre University.

Work 
In the 1980s Pace worked in Rome and Paris where, in the mid-1980s, he founded "Le Filtranisme" a neo-existencialist philosophical and artistic current witch has an optic close to Renaissance and an anthropocosmic vision.

Inspired by sources as diverse as fashion, history, electronic music and decorative arts, Pace uses different techniques (such as painting, assemblage, sculpture, electronic engravings, photography) influenced by the iconography of mass society, philosophy and psychoanalysis.

Also assembling objects such as costume jewellery or recycled materials such as wood, metals or frosted glass of refrigerators shelves, Pace above all uses painting as his favorite medium.

During the 1980s Parisian period, he befriends the Brazilian artist Sergio Valle Duarte. and the bilingual writer Albert Russo. In the summer of 1990 meaningful is the encounter between the sociologist Kurt Heinrich Wolff about the epistemological "surrender-and-catch" concepts that changed the Pace work from figurative painting to the abstract expressionism. His work gives an artistic and intellectual pathway with which Pace reinterprets many psychic realities.

After the figurative period (1977–1990), the abstract period (1990–) is first characterized by the "Periodo dei Legni" (Woods's period 1990–1996) and the "Factor C" studies (1997) and subsequently by the still in progress series, "IDM" (Unshakableness of the Memory, 2000–) and "ATONS" (dedicated to the techno and electronic music, 2005–). Pace is also working on "ENGRAVING" (printmakings elaborate with computer) and "MIDAS", the sculptures/assemblages of jewellery.

From 1996 to 2008, Pace worked as a university teaching assistant of Sociology of knowledge and Art, and History of sociology at the Faculty of Sociology of the Sapienza University of Rome.

Exhibitions (selection) 
His solo shows includes the Museum of Art of the Parliament of São Paulo (2010), CRC in São Paulo (2010), Theatro Municipal of Jaguariúna (2011), Forte Sangallo in Nettuno (2011), Museum Boncompagni Ludovisi, National Gallery of Modern and Contemporary Art of Rome (2014), Museum Venanzo Crocetti in Rome (2015), Câmara Municipal de Itapevi (2018), Pantheon, Rome, Basilica of Santa Maria ad Martyres, Polo Museale del Lazio (2018), Biblioteca Storica Nazionale dell'Agricoltura, Ministry of Agricultural, Food and Forestry Policies, Rome (2019), Câmara Municipal de Itapevi (2020), CRC in São Paulo (2020), Pantheon, Basilica of Santa Maria ad Martyres, Direzione Musei Statali di Roma, Ministry of Culture, Rome (2021) - Travelling exhibition, Basilica of St. Lawrence in Lucina, Rome (2021),   Museo Archeologico Nazionale di Civitavecchia, Polo Museale del Lazio, Ministry of culture (2022),  Boncompagni Ludovisi Decorative Art Museum, Ministry of Culture, Direzione dei Musei Statali della Città di Roma (2022). 

His group exhibitions includes the Diocesan Museum of Amalfi (2012), Forte Sangallo in Nettuno (2012), Italian Embassy in Brasilia (2013), Museum Venanzo Crocetti in Rome (2014), Museum Afro Brasil in São Paulo (2014), Florence Biennale (2015), Castello Normanno-Svevo in Bari, Polo Museale della Puglia, Ministry of Cultural Heritage (2019), Copertino Castle, Lecce, Polo Museale della Puglia, Ministry of Cultural Heritage (2019–2020), Boncompagni Ludovisi Decorative Art Museum,  Ministry of Culture, Direzione dei Musei Statali della Città di Roma (2021), Basilica of St. Lawrence in Lucina (2022).

Notes

References 

 Emanuel von Lauenstein Massarani, Joseph Pace, Ave Crux, Spes Una, ed. Amazon, September 2021, 
 Albert Russo, Joseph Pace, His Life, His Work, His Art, ed. Amazon, July 2021, 
 Mariastella Margozzi, Libri d'artista. L'arte da leggere (New edition). Catalogo della mostra, Museo Boncompagni Ludovisi, 21 Maggio – 17 Ottobre 2021, Roma, ADDA Editore, Bari, June 2021, 
 Mariastella Margozzi, Libri d'artista - L'arte da leggere, pp. 142, 143. Catalogo della mostra, Castello Svevo di Bari, giugno-ottobre 2019; Lecce, Castello di Copertino, novembre-dicembre 2019, ADDA Editore, Bari, 2019, 
 National Historical Library of Agriculture, Joseph Pace - Sacra Sacrorum - Catalogue, Ministry of Agricultural Policies, Rome, 2019
 Pantheon in Rome, Joseph Pace - Sacra Sacrorum - The Sacred of the Sacred Things - Catalogue, Pantheon in Rome, Basilica of Santa Maria ad Martyres, Rome, 2019
 Circolo Italiano in São Paulo, Joseph Pace - Dinamismo Vital e Força Cosmica - Comemoração à Data Nacional da Itàlia - Catalogue, Circolo Italiano in São Paulo, São Paulo, 2015
 Florence Biennale - Art And The Polis, Catalogue, pp. 49, 50, Fausto Lupetti Editore, 2015,  
 Jumeirah Magazine, p. 16, Joseph Pace Filtranisme, January 2015, Dubai, UAE (United Arab Emirates)
 Твоя Италия. Выставки в Италии 2015 вторая часть, Joseph Pace (Filtranisme), Museo Venanzo Crocetti с12 по 28 января
 ローマ】ローマ郊外でくつろぎの時を クロチェッティ美術館, 酒井 香織 (Museo Crocetti: Joseph Pace Filtranisme)
 Museo Venanzo Crocetti, Joseph Pace Filtranisme, Gaby Pern, Roma, January 2015, Italy
 Museo Boncompagni Ludovisi, Galleria Nazionale d'Arte Moderna e Contemporanea di Roma, Mariastella Margozzi: Joseph Pace, L'Eva Futura, Roma, December 2014, Italy
 Rome, My Sibling, My Empress: The Plebeian, The Trivial, The Sublime, by Albert Russo, pp. 96,98/99, June 2013, Charleston, South Carolina, USA, 
 Ambasciata d'Italia a Brasilia, Arte Italo-Brasileira, Catalogue by Attilio De Gasperis, pp. 32,33, Brasilia, June 2013, Brasil
 Diario official da Assembleia Legislativa de Sao Paulo, Emanuel von Lauenstein Massarani, 25 March 2013, São Paulo, Brasil
 Mariastella Margozzi, Un mondo al quadrato, pp. 2,3, Spazio 88, Roma, 2013, Italy
 Istituto de Recupeaçao do Patrimonio Historico, Catalogo Arte Italia-Brasil 2011–2012, Emanuel von Lauenstein Massarani, pp. 158/161, June 2012, São Paulo, Brasil, 
 Quattrocchi Lavinio, Una vita raccontata da Joseph Pace, pp. 32,33, Anzio, 2012, Italy
 Giampiero Pedace, Livia Bucci, Filtranisme, Catalogue, TiberCopia, Roma, July 2011, Italy
 Prefeitura de Jaguariuna, Dinamismo cosmico do artista Joseph Pace, Maria das Graças Hansen Albaran, Jaguariuna, 2011, Brasil
 Livia Bucci, Mostra di Joseph Pace, le filtranisme a Forte Sangallo, Quattrocchi Lavinio, Anzio, July 2011, Italy
 Emanuel L. Massarani, Joseph Pace, Elite, Arte, São Paulo, SP, 2010, Brasil
 Mariastella Margozzi, Pino Procopio, Catalogue: Impermanenza, Opere dal 2000 al 2010 – Tibercopia, Roma, March 2010, Italy
 CRC (Conselho Regional de Contabilitade), Emoções, São Paulo, May 2010, Brasil
 Il Giornale di Alessandria, Efrem Bovo, Joseph Pace, Alessandria, November 2009, Italy
 Equitazione&Ambiente, Lettera di incoraggiamento ai giovani artisti, p. 21, Roma, 2009, Italy
 Quattrocchi su Roma, Mascia Ferri, Artisti a Roma, Joseph Pace Filtranisme, May 2009
 Il Messaggero, Marcella Smocovich, Arte per Otto, Roma, Feb. 2009, Italy
 Arte Cultura e Società, Paolo Nobili, La Mostra, Non Solo Arte, Roma, 2009, Italy
  Roma C’è, ArteXOtto, Miscellanee, Roma, Feb. 2009, Italy
 Benito Recchilongo, Galleria Andrè, Feb. 2009, Roma
 Marisatella Margozzi, Pino Procopio, Catalogue: Joseph Pace dalle cose al sopravvento del colore, opere dal 2000 al 2008, Tibercopia Roma, 2008, Italy
 Equitazione&Ambiente Arte, Crash, Joseph Pace, p. 12, Roma, Nov. 2008, Italy
 Annuario d’Arte Moderna, Pablo M.Landi, p. 121, Roma, 2008, Italy
 Equitazione&Ambiente Arte, Marcello Paris, Intervista a Joseph Pace, pp. 23,24,25, Roma, June 2008, Italy
 Leila Bottarelli, Crash, Opere di Joseph Pace, Nov. 2008, Alessandria
 Mariastella Margozzi e Mascia Ferri, Crash, Alessandria, Nov. 2008, Italy
 Arte&Arte, by Mascia Ferri, l’Irremovibilità della Memoria, Sept. 2007, Italy
 ISIS News , Mariastella Margozzi, a cura di Marcello Bisegna, Quando le geometrie della memoria diventano arte, 2007, Roma
 Marisatella Margozzi, Joseph Pace: L’irremovibilità della memoria, Centro d’Arte La Bitta, Roma, Nov. 2007, Italy
 Mascia Ferri, Le Filtranisme, Centro d’Arte La Bitta, Roma, Nov. 2007, Italy
 Equitazione&Ambiente Arte, Joseph Pace, L’uomo è un filtro?, Roma, Sept. 2006, Italy
 Mascia Ferri, Contras, Il Busto Mistero, Alba, 2002, Italy
 Carl Speranza, Colors, Galleria Clio, Alessandria, Italy
 Giorgio Conte, Joseph Pace: Fenêtres, Galleria Valeno, Lucera, Oct. 1998, Italy
 Pablo M.Landi, Joseph Pace, Deducir, Galerìa de Arte Munoz, Madrid, 1996, Spain
 Pino Procopio, Windows, Centro d’Arte La Bitta, Roma, 1994, Italy
 Pablo M.Landi, Joseph Pace, Expòsicion Universal de Sevilla, Sevilla, 1992, Spain
 Juan Maria Cortez, Trosos de Queso, Galerìa Felez, Barcelona, 1992, Spain
 Pablo M.Landi, Joseph Pace, Galerie d’Art Hulot, Paris, 1988, France

External links 

 
 Joseph Pace at the National Gallery of Modern Art of Rome, Museo Boncompagni Ludovisi of Decorative Arts
 Museum Venanzo Crocetti
 ローマ】ローマ郊外でくつろぎの時を クロチェッティ美術館, 酒井 香織, Museum Venanzo Crocetti, Kaori Sakai 2014
 Museu de Arte, ALESP
 Italian Embassy in Brasilia, Art Catalogue "Arte Italo-Brasileira" (PDF pp. 32,33)
 Museu de Arte, ALESP
 Joseph Pace at Forte Sangallo, Nettuno
 Espaço Cultural do CRC-SP
 Joseph Pace at the Teatro Municipal in Jaguariúna
 Joseph Pace (Italian and English critics, interview, articles)
 Giornal.it, La Mostra
 Pittore Morbegnese in Mostra a San Paolo del Brasile
 Agenda Vilma Borges, CRC (Espaço Cultural do Conselho de Contabilitade), Exposiçao do artista italiano Joseph Pace
 Joseph Pace, Impermanenza
 Artista lombardo emoziona San Paolo del Brasile
 Arte Italo-Brasileira
 Comune di Nettuno, La Mostra a Forte Sangallo
 Le Fitranisme
 L’Impermanenza delle cose e dei fenomeni

Living people
1959 births
People from the Province of Sondrio
20th-century Italian painters
Italian male painters
21st-century Italian painters
20th-century Italian sculptors
20th-century Italian male artists
Italian male sculptors
21st-century Italian sculptors
21st-century Italian male artists